The Prandtl number  (Pr) or Prandtl group is a dimensionless number, named after the German physicist Ludwig Prandtl, defined as the ratio of momentum diffusivity to thermal diffusivity. The Prandtl number is given as:

 

where:
  : momentum diffusivity (kinematic viscosity), (SI units: m2/s)
  : thermal diffusivity, (SI units: m2/s)
  : dynamic viscosity, (SI units: Pa s = N s/m2)
  : thermal conductivity, (SI units: W/(m·K))
  : specific heat, (SI units: J/(kg·K))
  : density, (SI units: kg/m3).

Note that whereas the Reynolds number and Grashof number are subscripted with a scale variable, the Prandtl number contains no such length scale and is dependent only on the fluid and the fluid state. The Prandtl number is often found in property tables alongside other properties such as viscosity and thermal conductivity.

The mass transfer analog of the Prandtl number is the Schmidt number and the ratio of the Prandtl number and the Schmidt number is the Lewis number.

Experimental Values

Typical Values 
For most gases over a wide range of temperature and pressure,  is approximately constant. Therefore, it can be used to determine the thermal conductivity of gases at high temperatures, where it is difficult to measure experimentally due to the formation of convection currents.

 0.003 for molten potassium at 975 K
 around 0.015 for mercury
 0.065 for molten lithium at 975 K
 around 0.16–0.7 for mixtures of noble gases or noble gases with hydrogen
 0.63 for oxygen
 around 0.71 for air and many other gases
 1.38 for gaseous ammonia
 between 4 and 5 for R-12 refrigerant
 around 7.56 for water (At 18 °C)
 13.4 and 7.2 for seawater (At 0 °C and 20 °C respectively)
 50 for n-butanol
 between 100 and 40,000 for engine oil
 1000 for glycerol
 10,000 for polymer melts
 around 1 for Earth's mantle.

Formula for the calculation of the Prandtl number of air and water 
For air with a pressure of 1 bar, the Prandtl numbers in the temperature range between −100 °C and +500 °C can be calculated using the formula given below. The temperature is to be used in the unit degree Celsius. The deviations are a maximum of 0.1 % from the literature values. 

The Prandtl numbers for water (1 bar) can be determined in the temperature range between 0 °C and 90 °C using the formula given below. The temperature is to be used in the unit degree Celsius. The deviations are a maximum of 1 % from the literature values.

Physical Interpretation 
Small values of the Prandtl number, means the thermal diffusivity dominates. Whereas with large values, the momentum diffusivity dominates the behavior.
For example, the listed value for liquid mercury indicates that the heat conduction is more significant compared to convection, so thermal diffusivity is dominant.
However, for engine oil, convection is very effective in transferring energy from an area in comparison to pure conduction, so momentum diffusivity is dominant.

The Prandtl numbers of gases are about 1, which indicates that both momentum and heat dissipate through the fluid at about the same rate. Heat diffuses very quickly in liquid metals and very slowly in oils relative to momentum. Consequently thermal boundary layer is much thicker for liquid metals and much thinner for oils relative to velocity boundary layer.

In heat transfer problems, the Prandtl number controls the relative thickness of the momentum and thermal boundary layers. When  is small, it means that the heat diffuses quickly compared to the velocity (momentum). This means that for liquid metals the thermal boundary layer is much thicker than the velocity boundary layer.

In laminar boundary layers, the ratio of the thermal to momentum boundary layer thickness over a flat plate is well approximated by
 

For incompressible flow over a flat plate, the two Nusselt number correlations are asymptotically correct:
 
 

where  is the Reynolds number. These two asymptotic solutions can be blended together using the concept of the Norm (mathematics):

See also
 Turbulent Prandtl number
 Magnetic Prandtl number

References

General references
 

Convection
Dimensionless numbers of fluid mechanics
Dimensionless numbers of thermodynamics
Fluid dynamics